This is partial list of contemporary Chinese artists. This list is unlikely to be static.

A
Ai Weiwei

B
Bingyi (born 1975), painter

C
 
Chevalier li (born 1961) Painter, Installation. Chinese born French Artist
Cai Jin (born 1965), painter
Cang Xin
Cao Fei (born 1978), multimedia artist
Cao Yu (artist) (born 1988), visual artist
Cao Hui
Chang Ch'ung-ho or Zhang Chonghe (1914–2015), Chinese-American poet, painter, calligrapher
Chen Guang
Chen Ke
Chen Man
Chen, Movana (1975–present), paper knitting artist
Chen Peiqiu (born 1922), the best-selling woman painter alive
Chen Qiang
Chen Shaoxiong
Chen Shuxia
Chow Chung-cheng (1908–1996), finger painter, writer
Chow Chun Fai

D
Ding Yi

F
Fu Yu

G
Gao Minglu
Guan Zilan or Violet Kwan (1903–1986), avant-garde painter

H
Han Yajuan (born 1980), contemporary artist
He Xiangning (1878–1972), feminist, politician, painter, poet*Hai Bo
He Yunchang
Huang Yan

I
Inri

J
Aowen Jin (active since 2010), Chinese-born British artist

K
Kan Xuan (born 1972), visual artist

L
Li Chevalier (born 1961) Painting; Installation Chinese born French artist ( 诗蓝 in Chinese)
Li Shuang (born 1957), contemporary artist
Liao Jingwen (1923–2015), calligrapher and curator of the Xu Beihong Memorial Museum
Li Di
Li He
Liu Xiaodong
Liu Ye

M
Miao Xiaochun
Michael Lin
Mok Hing Ling

P
Peng Wei (born 1974), contemporary artist

Q
Qiu Deshu

S
Sakimichan (born 1991) digital painter
Sun Duoci (1912–1975), painter
Shen Shaomin
Shi Jinsong

T 
 Fan Tchunpi (1898–1986), painter and ceramicist

W
Evan Siu Ping Wu (active since 2012), painter
Wang Jianwei
Wang Qingsong

X
Xiao Lu (born 1962), installation and video artist
Xin Fengxia (1927–1998), pingju actress, painter, writer
Xiang Jing

Y 
Yijun Liao
 Ying Miao (born 1985), internet artist
Yan Cong
Yan Xiaojing (active 2007–present)
Yim Maukun

Z
Zimei (active since 1999), multidisciplinary artist, musician
Zhang Feng
Zhang Xiaogang
Zhang Xiaotao
Zhong Wei
Zhou Chengzhou (born 1982), filmmaker and photographer
Zhou Jin Hua

See also 
 List of Chinese artists

References

Contemporary artists, List of Chinese
Chinese contemporary artists